The Duna–Pogaya (Duna–Bogaia) languages are a proposed small family of Trans–New Guinea languages in the classification of Voorhoeve (1975), Ross (2005) and Usher (2018), consisting of two languages, Duna and Bogaya, which in turn form a branch of the larger Trans–New Guinea family. Glottolog, which is based largely on Usher, however finds the connections between the two languages to be tenuous, and the connection to TNG unconvincing.

Language contact
Duna has had significant influence on Bogaya due to the socioeconomic dominance of Duna speakers over the less populous, less influential Bogaya speakers. Duna also has much more influence from Huli (a widely spoken Trans-New Guinea language) at 27–32 percent lexical similarity with Huli, while Duna has only 5-10 percent.

Pronouns
Pronouns are:

{|
! !!sg!!du!!pl
|-
!1
|*nó||*ge-na||*i-nu
|-
!2
|*gó|| ||
|-
!3
|*kó|| ||*ki-nu
|}

Vocabulary comparison
The following basic vocabulary words are from McElhanon & Voorhoeve (1970), Shaw (1973), and Shaw (1986), as cited in the Trans-New Guinea database:

{| class="wikitable sortable"
! gloss !! Bogaya !! Duna
|-
! head
| yeľʌ; yela || kuni
|-
! hair
| heepi; yeľʌ eľika || hini
|-
! ear
| hona; hɔnʌn || kɔhane; konane
|-
! eye
| kina; kiːnʌn || le
|-
! nose
| kuuma; pfouľu || kuma
|-
! tooth
| yagai; yʌkʌi || ne; nee
|-
! tongue
| iki; ɩkin || ogone; ɔgɔne
|-
! leg
| yehei; yehʌi || tia
|-
! louse
| fando; fiľʌ || tete
|-
! dog
| ɔv̧ɔpi; yau || yawi
|-
! pig
| ʌpʌn || isa
|-
! bird
| aka; pitʌkʌ || heka
|-
! egg
| oondi; pitʌkʌ ɔ̃udi || hapa
|-
! blood
| sokoya; yesʌ || kuyila
|-
! bone
| hakale; hʌv̧ʌľe || kuni
|-
! skin
| hugwa; hukuʌn || pulu
|-
! breast
| alu; ʌľu || abu; adu; amu
|-
! tree
| dowa; tɔuʌ || lowa; lɔwa
|-
! man
| ami; ʌmĩ || anoa; anɔa
|-
! woman
| ĩmiʌ; imya || ima
|-
! sun
| owa; ɔwa || hewa
|-
! moon
| kaiyuu; kʌiu || eke
|-
! water
| paiyuku; pʌiuku || yu
|-
! fire
| dowada; tɔun || lɔwa  kiliana; lowa puru
|-
! stone
| haana; hʌnʌ || kana; kuna
|-
! name
| ʌmĩn; yaga || yaka
|-
! eat
| nã; nosii || nai-; neyana
|-
! one
| mɔsʌ kɔmʌ; moso || du
|-
! two
| efʌn; yeefa || yapa
|}

Evolution
Duna reflexes of proto-Trans-New Guinea (pTNG) etyma are:

amu ‘breast’ < *amu
konane ‘ear’ < *kand(e,i)k(V]
kuni ‘bone’ < *kondaC

References

 
Trans–New Guinea languages
Languages of Papua New Guinea